Abhishek Shankar is an Indian Tamil film and television actor who has worked on films and serials.

Career
Abhishek made his debut as an actor with Gnana Rajasekaran's critically acclaimed drama film Mogamul (1995), playing a leading role alongside Archana Joglekar. Unable to sustain a career in films, he switched over to television in 1999 after Ekta Kapoor offered him a role in her new serial, Kudumbam. He subsequently assisted her in the production of the Tamil television series, as well as portraying a comedy role. He went on to work on nearly forty more serials and rose to prominence, portraying the character Bhaskaran in the serial, Kolangal. The success of the show meant he was selected to feature in other shows in the late 2000s including Malargal, Girija and Kollywood Court on television.

In 2009, he announced his intentions of directing and producing films under his home banner of Hollywood to Bollywood Films. He began work on his directorial debut Kathai featuring newcomers, and the film had a low-profile release in January 2012. The film won mixed reviews, with a critic from Sify.com noting he "should be patted on his back for touching up on such a heavy subject". Abhishek then announced another project titled Kaiyazhuthu with Shaan, who played the lead role in Kathai, during the making of his first film, but the venture was later left incomplete. He launched another directorial venture in May 2012, a police action adventure with Samuthirakani, but the film failed to progress. Regarding his performance in Ka Pae Ranasingam, a critic stated that "A tip of the hat to actor Abhishek, who despite the limited scope of his character (a Government official), was one of only three or four actors in the film who delivers a close-to-believable performance".

Selected filmography

As actor
Films

Web series

As director

TV Series
As actor

As director

References

External links
 
 Abhishek Shankar on Facebook

Indian male film actors
Tamil male actors
Male actors from Chennai
Living people
Male actors in Tamil cinema
Tamil film directors
Male actors in Malayalam cinema
21st-century Indian male actors
1964 births